Center for Advanced Study may refer to:

U.S.
 Center for Advanced Study in the Visual Arts (CASVA) of the National Gallery of Art in Washington, D.C.
 Center for Advanced Defense Studies (CADS), a non-profit, non-governmental national security group in Washington, D.C.
 Center for Advanced Judaic Studies of the University of Pennsylvania
 Center for Advanced Studies and the Arts, a public consortium high school in Oak Park, Michigan
 Center for Advanced Study in the Behavioral Sciences, American interdisciplinary think tank in Stanford, California
 Center for Advanced Study of Language (CASL), College Park, Maryland
 Center for Advanced Visual Studies of the Massachusetts Institute of Technology
 Center for the Advanced Study of India (CASI), a research center on contemporary India at the University of Pennsylvania
 IBM Centers for Advanced Studies (CAS)
 Southwest Center for Advanced Studies (SCAS), former name of the University of Texas at Dallas

Other countries
 Bangladesh Center for Advanced Studies (BCAS), a think tank in Bangladesh
 Center for Advanced Studies in Engineering (CASE), a postgraduate institute in Islamabad, Pakistan
 Center for Advanced Studies on Puerto Rico and the Caribbean, a state university in Old San Juan, San Juan, Puerto Rico
 Center for Advanced Study in Theoretical Linguistics (CASTL) of the University of Tromsø, Norway
 Center for Advanced Study, Tsinghua University, Beijing, China
 National Center for Advanced Studies (NCAS), Sri Lanka
 Recife Center for Advanced Studies and Systems (CESAR), Development and Innovation institute in Brazil